UIMA, short for Unstructured Information Management Architecture, is an OASIS standard  for content analytics, originally developed at IBM.  It provides a component software architecture for the development, discovery, composition, and deployment of multi-modal analytics for the analysis of unstructured information and integration with search technologies.

Structure 
The UIMA architecture can be thought of in four dimensions:
 It specifies component interfaces in an analytics pipeline.
 It describes a set of design patterns.
 It suggests two data representations: an in-memory representation of annotations for high-performance analytics and an XML representation of annotations for integration with remote web services.
 It suggests development roles allowing tools to be used by users with diverse skills.

Implementations and uses 

Apache UIMA, a reference implementation of UIMA, is maintained by the Apache Software Foundation.

UIMA is used in a number of software projects:
 IBM Research's Watson uses UIMA for analyzing unstructured data.
 The Clinical Text Analysis and Knowledge Extraction System (Apache cTAKES) is a UIMA-based system for information extraction from medical records.
 DKPro Core is a collection of reusable UIMA components for general-purpose natural language processing.

See also 
 Data Discovery and Query Builder
 Entity extraction
 General Architecture for Text Engineering (GATE)
 IBM Omnifind
 LanguageWare

References

External links 
Apache UIMA home page

Apache Software Foundation projects
Software architecture
Data mining and machine learning software